Potpisani (Serbian Cyrillic: Потписани) is a Serbian alternative TV serial and parody of "Otpisani" from 2007, 2008 and 2010 by MK Art Studio.

Like in origin TV series "Otpisani", the subject of the "Potpisani" is the underground partisan resistance in Belgrade during World War II.

In addition, targets of this parody are also many famous hollywood movies like Star Wars, The Matrix, Superman III, Home Alone, Charlie Chaplin's and Bruce Lee's films and also a lot of famous Serbian movies and series like The Marathon Family, Balkan Spy, Nacionalna klasa, Vratice se rode etc.

Podbradak potpisanih (Serbian Cyrillic: Подбрадак потписаних) is continuance of "Potpisani", something like 2nd season, which is parodied name of
"Povratak otpisanih", continuance of "Otpisani".

List of episodes 

Potpisani (Undersigned)

Podbradak potpisanih (Chin of Undersigned)

Main cast

This is a list of characters who have appeared in the Potpisani film serial.

Public screenings, festivals and awards 
After screenings on several TV stations, "Potpisani" had own public cinema life in "Culture house of campus" in Belgrade June 18, 2010 in the „No budget“ festival.
August 14, 2011 "Potpisani (episode 1)" won "Woody dwarf" at The First Festival of Independent off-films in Serbian Holywood.
April 12, 2012 "Podbradak potpisanih" was shown on the big screen in "Culture house of campus" in Belgrade.
July 29, 2012 "Potpisani (episode 3)" won "Woody dwarf" for the Third place at The Second Festival of Independent off-films in Serbian Holywood.
March 16, 2013 "Potpisani (episode 4)" was shown on the big screen in "Dom omladine Beograda"
August 4, 2013 "Potpisani (episode 4)" was shown on the big screen at The Third Festival of Independent off-films in Serbian Holywood.

References

External links
 
 Trailer of the 3rd episode (YouTube)
 Official website in english
 Official website in serbian

World War II television drama series
Serbian comedy television series
Parodies of television shows
Television shows set in Belgrade
Television shows filmed in Belgrade
Fictional Yugoslav Partisans